The arrondissement of Mortagne-au-Perche is an arrondissement of France in the Orne department in the Normandy region. It has 151 communes.

Composition

The communes of the arrondissement of Mortagne-au-Perche, and their INSEE codes, are:

 L'Aigle (61214)
 Appenai-sous-Bellême (61005)
 Les Aspres (61422)
 Aube (61008)
 Aubry-le-Panthou
 Auguaise (61012)
 Les Authieux-du-Puits
 Avernes-Saint-Gourgon
 Bazoches-sur-Hoëne (61029)
 Beaufai (61032)
 Beaulieu (61034)
 Belforêt-en-Perche (61196)
 Bellavilliers (61037)
 Bellême (61038)
 Bellou-le-Trichard (61041)
 Berd'huis (61043)
 Bizou (61046)
 Boëcé (61048)
 Bonnefoi (61052)
 Bonsmoulins (61053)
 Le Bosc-Renoult
 Brethel (61060)
 Bretoncelles (61061)
 Camembert
 Canapville
 Ceton (61079)
 Les Champeaux
 Champeaux-sur-Sarthe (61087)
 Champ-Haut
 Champosoult
 Chandai (61092)
 La Chapelle-Montligeon (61097)
 La Chapelle-Souëf (61099)
 La Chapelle-Viel (61100)
 Charencey (61429)
 Chaumont
 Chemilli (61105)
 Cisai-Saint-Aubin
 Comblot (61113)
 Corbon (61118)
 Coulimer (61121)
 Coulmer
 Courgeon (61129)
 Courgeoût (61130)
 Cour-Maugis-sur-Huisne (61050)
 Croisilles
 Crouttes
 Crulai (61140)
 Dame-Marie (61142)
 Échauffour
 Écorcei (61151)
 Fay (61159)
 Feings (61160)
 La Ferrière-au-Doyen (61162)
 La Ferté-en-Ouche
 La Fresnaie-Fayel
 Fresnay-le-Samson
 Gacé
 Les Genettes (61187)
 La Genevraie
 Godisson (61192)
 La Gonfrière
 Guerquesalles
 L'Hôme-Chamondot (61206)
 Igé (61207)
 Irai (61208)
 Lignères
 Loisail (61229)
 Longny-les-Villages (61230)
 La Madeleine-Bouvet (61241)
 Le Mage (61242)
 Mahéru (61244)
 Mardilly
 Mauves-sur-Huisne (61255)
 Le Ménil-Bérard (61259)
 Ménil-Froger
 Ménil-Hubert-en-Exmes
 Le Ménil-Vicomte
 Les Menus (61274)
 Le Merlerault
 La Mesnière (61277)
 Montgaudry (61286)
 Mortagne-au-Perche (61293)
 Moulins-la-Marche (61297)
 Moutiers-au-Perche (61300)
 Neuville-sur-Touques
 Nonant-le-Pin
 Orgères
 Origny-le-Roux (61319)
 Parfondeval (61322)
 Le Pas-Saint-l'Homer (61323)
 Perche-en-Nocé (61309)
 Pervenchères (61327)
 Le Pin-la-Garenne (61329)
 Planches
 Pontchardon
 Pouvrai (61336)
 Rai (61342)
 Rémalard-en-Perche (61345)
 Le Renouard
 Résenlieu
 Réveillon (61348)
 Roiville
 Sablons-sur-Huisne (61116)
 Saint-Aquilin-de-Corbion (61363)
 Saint-Aubin-de-Bonneval
 Saint-Aubin-de-Courteraie (61367)
 Saint-Cyr-la-Rosière (61379)
 Saint-Denis-sur-Huisne (61381)
 Sainte-Céronne-lès-Mortagne (61373)
 Sainte-Gauburge-Sainte-Colombe
 Saint-Evroult-de-Montfort
 Saint-Evroult-Notre-Dame-du-Bois
 Saint-Fulgent-des-Ormes (61388)
 Saint-Germain-d'Aunay
 Saint-Germain-de-Clairefeuille
 Saint-Germain-de-la-Coudre (61394)
 Saint-Germain-de-Martigny (61396)
 Saint-Germain-des-Grois (61395)
 Saint-Hilaire-le-Châtel (61404)
 Saint-Hilaire-sur-Erre (61405)
 Saint-Hilaire-sur-Risle (61406)
 Saint-Jouin-de-Blavou (61411)
 Saint-Langis-lès-Mortagne (61414)
 Saint-Mard-de-Réno (61418)
 Saint-Martin-d'Écublei (61423)
 Saint-Martin-des-Pézerits (61425)
 Saint-Martin-du-Vieux-Bellême (61426)
 Saint-Michel-Tubœuf (61432)
 Saint-Nicolas-de-Sommaire
 Saint-Ouen-de-Sécherouvre (61438)
 Saint-Ouen-sur-Iton (61440)
 Saint-Pierre-des-Loges (61446)
 Saint-Pierre-la-Bruyère (61448)
 Saint-Sulpice-sur-Risle (61456)
 Saint-Symphorien-des-Bruyères (61457)
 Le Sap-André
 Sap-en-Auge
 Soligny-la-Trappe (61475)
 Suré (61476)
 Ticheville
 Touquettes
 Tourouvre au Perche (61491)
 La Trinité-des-Laitiers
 Val-au-Perche (61484)
 Vaunoise (61498)
 La Ventrouze (61500)
 Verrières (61501)
 Villiers-sous-Mortagne (61507)
 Vimoutiers
 Vitrai-sous-Laigle (61510)

History

The arrondissement of Mortagne-au-Perche was created in 1800, disbanded in 1926 and restored in 1942. At the January 2017 reorganisation of the arrondissements of Orne, it gained 49 communes from the arrondissement of Argentan and one commune from the arrondissement of Alençon, and it lost five communes to the arrondissement of Alençon.

As a result of the reorganisation of the cantons of France which came into effect in 2015, the borders of the cantons are no longer related to the borders of the arrondissements. The cantons of the arrondissement of Mortagne-au-Perche were, as of January 2015:

 L'Aigle-Est
 L'Aigle-Ouest
 Bazoches-sur-Hoëne
 Bellême
 Longny-au-Perche
 Mortagne-au-Perche
 Moulins-la-Marche
 Nocé
 Pervenchères
 Rémalard
 Le Theil
 Tourouvre

References

Mortagne-au-Perche